Muddle Earth is a children's novel by Paul Stewart, published in 2003, and illustrated by Chris Riddell. It is largely a parody of The Lord of the Rings by J. R. R. Tolkien. Like LOTR it is divided into three sections: Englebert the Enormous, Here Be Dragons and Doctor Cuddles of Giggle Glade. In 2011, a sequel titled Muddle Earth Too was published.

Plot

Joe Jefferson, a boy from the ordinary world (Earth), has been summoned to Muddle Earth, a medieval fantasy world "full of monsters and mayhem and more", by the wizard Randalf. He is then exhorted as a "warrior-hero".  In other words, he must fight evil on behalf of Randalf, who has in turn been contracted by the ruler of Muddle Earth, the Horned Baron. The Horned Baron, however, has problems that even Randalf cannot attend to: his wife Ingrid is a very demanding woman. This is a trait that the evil villain Doctor Cuddles pays heed to, and uses to his advantage in all three sections of the novel.

Similarities to The Lord of the Rings

Characters

Joe: the reluctant hero, who just wants to go home – Frodo
Randalf: Incompetent wizard – Gandalf
Brenda: the warrior princess. Scared of nothing, apart from elves (her only appearance in the CBBC series was in the episode "Randalf's Memory Meltdown") –  Éowyn
Elves: Hardworking, and resembling the house-elves from the Harry Potter series (though the elves speak English in the book, in the CBBC series they all speak mainly in their own language) – Elves: Proud warriors and elegant beings
 Talking Trees: Found in Elfwood – Ents or Huorns
Margot: treasure-loving dragon – Smaug
 Doctor Cuddles of Giggle Glade – Sauron (his appearance is similar to the Black Riders / Ring Wraiths)
 Quentin The Cake Decorator: A previous warrior-hero of Randalf who has joined Doctor Cuddles – Saruman The White (Leader of Gandalf's order who has joined Sauron)
 The Horned Baron: the leader of Muddle Earth – Arguably could be Théoden (i.e., under the control of an evil force, in his case his wife Ingrid) or Saruman (lives near Mount Boom in a tower)

Places

Muddle Earth – Middle-earth
Mount Boom: a mountain that intermittently goes "BOOM", thus the name – Mount Doom
Musty Mountains – The Misty Mountains: where Gollum was found by Bilbo Baggins

Other people and places 

People

Norbert – His full title is Norbert the Not-Very-Big, even though he is 15 feet tall. Cannot read.
Veronica – A blue budgie (green in the CBBC versions). Familiar of Roger the Wrinkled, and later Randalf.
Henry – Joe's faithful battle hound. Not seen in the CBBC series.
Roger the Wrinkled – The greatest wizard in Muddle Earth. Was captured by Dr Cuddles.
Bertram the Incredibly Hairy – Wizard. Captured by Dr Cuddles.
Boris the Bald – Wizard. Brother of Bertram. Captured by Dr Cuddles.
Eric the Mottled – Wizard. Captured by Dr Cuddles.
Ernie the Shrivelled – Wizard. Captured by Dr Cuddles.
Melyvn the Mauve – Wizard. Captured by Dr Cuddles.
Colin the Nondescript – Wizard. Helped Dr Cuddles create the Tickle Squad. Captured by Dr Cuddles.
The Horned Baron – Ruler of Muddle Earth. Husband of Ingrid, who always refers him as Walter (his first name). His appearance is a possible reference to the Horned King from The Black Cauldron. In Muddle Earth Too he is retired and it is revealed he is a goblin.  He is a major character in the CBBC series.
Ingrid – Unseen wife of the Horned Baron.  Is also a minor character in Muddle Earth Too.  Described as having huge, pudgy legs and big feet.  She is only heard in the CBBC series, though is seen as a dragon in the episode "Don't Go Changing" as a result of a spell gone wrong.
Grubley – Owner of Grubleys Discount Department store. He appears briefly in Muddle Earth Too. So far, he had four appearances in the CBBC series.
Smink – Grubley's assistant. He also appears briefly in Muddle Earth Too. Like Grubley, he had four appearances so far in the CBBC series, though on his first two he is seen working on his own as a travelling salesman (and a con-artist as well, as seen in the fourth episode).
Fifi – Also known as Mucky Maud of Mucky Maud's Lumpy Custard Club.  Loves the Horned Baron. In Muddle Earth Too she is the, now retired, Horned Baron's wife. Has made three appearances in the CBBC series so far, the first of which her face wasn't seen.
Englebert the Enormous – Huge ogre. Terrorised Muddle Earth by squeezing sheep while looking for its snuggly-wuggly, which Dr Cuddles stole and sold it to Grubley who made them into singing curtains for Ingrid. A similar ogre appears in one episode in the CBBC series but is unnamed.
Benson – Head gardener for the Horned Baron. Promoted to the Horned Baron's personal manservant. Later promoted to Horned Baron, though in the CBBC series, he remains the Horned Baron's manservant.
Margot – Friendly female dragon. Likes Norbert. Likes shiny things. She does not appear in Muddle Earth Too. Also she is blue (purple in the CBBC series)
Smarm – A gnome who works in Fifi's club.
Lord of the Teaspoons – A small silver teaspoon who travels all around Muddle Earth to seek the cutlery who will not rest till they are led by him.
Quentin the Cake Decorator – Randalf's first warrior hero. Now serves Dr Cuddles. In Muddle Earth Too he is the cake druid and master of the cake competition. Not seen in the CBBC series due to the inclusion of Pesticide.
Dr. Cuddles – A mysterious, cloaked figure; evil, bitter and power-hungry. Constantly tries to take over the land. Revealed to be Randalf's pink (blue in the CBBC series) teddy-bear, Charlie Cuddles, whom Randalf animated by accident.

Places

Here Be Dragons – Area of mountains with many caves full of dragons.
Harmless Hill – Quaint looking hill. Quite harmless, you just have to look out for the killer daisies.
Trollbridge – A bridge inhabited by trolls. Very messy.
The Musty Mountains – A very, very old mountain range. They stink because all old things smell at least a little.
Elfwood – A wide forest, once was home to the elves, until they were all employed around Muddle Earth. Its trees can talk, making it an analogue to Fangorn Forest.
Goblintown – A large, cramped city with the buildings all built on top of each other. Home to the goblins. Very characteristic odour.
The Perfumed Bog – A wide purple bog. Smells sickly sweet. Possible analogue to the Dead Marshes.
The Enchanted Lake – A big, floating lake. Raised by, and home to, the wizards.
Ogrehills – A hilly area. Home to the ogres. Possible analogue to the Emyn Muil.
The Horned Baron's Castle – A big castle in the musty mountains. Home to the Horned Baron.
Giggle Glade – Home to Dr Cuddles. Is a glade with a sweet cottage situated in the middle of Elfwood.
The Sandpit – A pit full of sand. Good for Goblin picnics.

Sequel

In 2011 a sequel named Muddle Earth Too was published. It was also split into three parts, "Down with Stinkyhogs!", "The trouble with Big Sisters" and "Pesticide the Flower Fairy". It contains parody references from The Lord of the Rings, like its predecessor, but also throws in elements of Twilight, Harry Potter, The Lion, the Witch and the Wardrobe, A Midsummer Night's Dream, Hansel and Gretel, The Sword in the Stone, His Dark Materials and Sleeping Beauty. It follows Joe returning to Muddle Earth, through a wardrobe this time, with his big sister Ella (who made a minor appearance in Muddle Earth). He finds Randalf is now Headmaster of a new wizardry school named Stinkyhogs, built in the Horned Baron's castle after his retirement. They are competing against their rival school in the Muddle Earth annual game, Broomball, to win the Goblet of Porridge. But it has gone missing and Joe, Randalf, Ella and the others must go on a quest to find it. Along the way they meet the handsome Edward Gorgeous (Ella's love interest), the eccentric Lord Asbow, the peculiar Mr. Fluffy, the pompous Kings Edmund  & Peter, the prissy Queens Susan & Lucy, and the ruthless, two-faced Edwina Lovely, before meeting the troublesome Pesticide and the flower fairies.
The story features a great many more characters than Muddle Earth. Some of the major new characters include:
Pesticide – A flower fairy. She steals the Goblet of Porridge to become rich but is "not evil", just misunderstood.  She also appears in the CBBC series as Dr. Cuddles' accomplice and is depicted as a gothic fairy (her dress sense being intentional, often saying that she doesn't want to look like "something that's fallen off the top of the Christmas tree").
Nettle, Thistle and Briar Rose – Her accomplices, the flower faries.
Edwina Lovely – The major villain in the story. She appears nice but is in fact a ruthless vampire.
Edward Gorgeous – A handsome student at Stinkyhogs. He is in love with Ella. He has become a vampire because Edwina bit him.
Lord Asbow – The eccentric Dean of the University of Whatever. Has a dog named Damien.
Eudora Pinkwhistle – Muddle Earth's leading witch. A teacher at Stinkyhogs. Lives in Dr. Cuddles' old house.
Mr. Fluffy – The woodwork teacher at Stinkyhogs. He is a werehamster.
Kings Edmund & Peter and Queens Susan & Lucy – Pompous heads of Stinkyhogs' rival school.
Eraguff and Delia – Dragons.
Mrs. Couldn't Possibly – Asbow's assistant.
Smutley – Grubley's son.
Mr. Polly – A cyclops and teacher at Stinkyhogs.
Peat – The bog-man.
Titiana and Oberon – Pesticide's parents.
Several new places appear in the story as well, some of which were briefly mentioned in Muddle Earth. New places include:
Definitely no Dragons here – Only briefly mentioned in Muddle Earth. It is where the Kingdom of Kings Edmund & Peter and Queens Susan & Lucy lies.
Nowhere – Briefly mentioned in Muddle Earth. It consists of the barbarian camp, the cake competition and King Arthur's palace.
The University of Whatever – Run by Lord Asbow; contains many professors and their pets, all named Damien.

Other parody references
Potholes – the meaning is taken literally, as a hole in the ground for pots for elves to cook things in: "What better place for a pot than a pothole". Variants include kettleholes.
The Teaspoon – A small silver teaspoon. Revealed to be The Lord of the Teaspoons.

 One teaspoon to rule them all,
 one teaspoon to heed them,
 one teaspoon to bring them all to giggle glade and lead them!

CBBC adaptations
In late 2006, Muddle Earth was adapted as a one-off story for CBBC's Jackanory. The Jackanory version covers Englebert the Enormous only for time, with a light reading of the rest of the book towards the end. Muddle Earth is read by actor John Sessions and produced and directed by Nick Willing.

In 2009, the BBC commissioned an animated series of Muddle Earth for broadcast in spring 2010.  The series consists of 2 seasons of thirteen 11-minute episodes.  The programme is produced by CBBC (making the programme its first ever in-house long-form animation series as well as the first CBBC programme with music composed by Maurizio Malagnini and performed by the BBC Philharmonic), with animation from the Manchester-based Hullabaloo Studios, and features David Jason as the voice of Randalf. Sarah Muller serves as executive producer.

Episode List:
Series 1
Footwear of Doom
Ice Cold in Muddle
Ogre the Hills and Far Away
Muddle Earth Cuckoo
Babbling Brook
Turnip for the Books
Best Wizard in Show
Dragon Wind
Mordrolf the Magnificent
Clothes Maketh the Man
Randalf's Memory Meltdown
Missing Norbert
Love Potion

Series 2
Attack of the Trolls
Come into the Garden Mucky Maud
The Great Elf and Spoon Race
The Big Night Out
Don't Go Changing
Stampede
Pesticide Shall Go to the Ball
Ill Wind
Toy Soldiers
Fairy Fairy
Norbert and the Golden Ticket
The Horned Duke
The Big Match

There has been no announcement to release the series on DVD as yet.

Characters exclusive to the CBBC series
Newt – The main character and Randalf's adventurous apprentice, voiced by Paul Leyshon. Very similar in appearance to Joe from the original book.
Fang – Dr. Cuddles' pet batbird, whom he uses as a spy and source of information. Is also willing to work for Pesticide.
The Fairies – fairies that live in Fairy Valley, a location original to the CBBC series. Unlike traditional fairies, they are human-sized. They all wear dresses of varying colour, have different hairstyles and keep stiltmice as pets. The fairy with the bright blue dress is named Fifi and she appears to be their leader. Their sweetness comes from Fairy Dust; without it, they go out of control.
Various unnamed ogres
Gerald – A snuggly-wuggly who was stolen from an ogre by Pesticide under Dr. Cuddles' orders and thrown into the Horned Baron's castle to frame him for the theft, so the Horned Baron was taken by the ogre. Gerald didn't want to be the ogre's snuggly-wuggly again and got his wish when the ogre took Dr. Cuddles instead (due to similarity in appearances).
Tallulah – A red dragon with a nasty temper, and Margot's niece (the two dragons share similarities in appearance). Went on a rampage when her egg (which had her baby, Rupert, inside) was stolen.
The Babbling Brook – A talking, gossiping river. Dr. Cuddles used her to turn Randalf and Norbert against each other, under threat of being drained of her water supply. When Dr. Cuddles fell in as Randalf and Norbert were getting to the end of their duel paces, she admitted the ploy to the two of them.
Mordrolf the Magnificent – A wizard who was Randalf's old friend turned fraudulent thief. He had been stealing from all over Muddle Earth and usurped Randalf's position as official wizard to hide from the authorities. At the end of his episode, he was caught and was banned from practising magic and put on community service for his crimes (Randalf also jokes, "From now on, they can call him Mordrolf the Mucky!").
Prince Lionel Wolfclaw – the Prince of another land. His father can easily get annoyed should the prince be offended (which would be unlikely as he is oblivious to even Pesticide's actions against him) or should anything happen to him (which was almost made so by an irately uninterested Pesticide). In the end, he was sent to the Mirror Glacier to look for an "ice gremlin", but kept admiring his good looks there.
The Stinky Swamp Demons – creatures that manifest themselves in the form of people's worst fears. Dr. Cuddles conjured up the Stinky Smog to bring them out and terrorise Goblintown on Muddle Earth Day.
The Toy Soldiers – Computer-generated toy soldiers that Dr. Cuddles enchants in response to the Horned Baron's toy tax proposal. They then came to life on the thirteenth hour to capture the Horned Baron. They however turned against Cuddles when they were won over by Norbert's clothes-peg dolls.
The Horned Duke – The Horned Baron's cousin. Wanted to take control of Muddle Earth from him.

CBBC on the web
As of October 2010 Muddle Earth World has been available to the public. It is a casual MMO.

CBBC soundtrack
On 10 January 2011, the soundtrack of the CBBC series was released for digital download.

References

2003 British novels
Children's fantasy novels
British children's novels
British fantasy novels
Middle-earth parodies
2003 children's books
Macmillan Publishers books